Jannick Green Krejberg (born 29 September 1988) is a Danish handball player for Paris Saint-Germain and the Danish national team.

References

External links

1988 births
Living people
Danish male handball players
People from Lemvig
Olympic handball players of Denmark
Handball players at the 2016 Summer Olympics
Medalists at the 2016 Summer Olympics
Olympic gold medalists for Denmark
Olympic medalists in handball
Aalborg Håndbold players
Handball-Bundesliga players
Expatriate handball players
Danish expatriate sportspeople in Germany
Danish expatriate sportspeople in France
Sportspeople from the Central Denmark Region
SC Magdeburg players